The Large Rope (also known as The Long Rope) is a 1953 British crime film directed by Wolf Rilla and starring Donald Houston, Susan Shaw and Robert Brown.

Plot
After his release from prison a man returns to his village, where he is accused of murdering a woman.

Cast
 Donald Houston as Tom Penney
 Susan Shaw as Susan Hamble
 Robert Brown as Mick Jordan
 Vanda Godsell as Amy Jordan
 Peter Byrne as Jeff Stribling
 Richard Warner as Inspector Harmer
 Christine Finn as May
 Thomas Heathcote as James Gore
 Katie Johnson as Grandmother (uncredited)
 Hilda Fenemore as	Pub Landlady (uncredited)

Critical reception
The film historians Steve Chibnall and Brian McFarlane describe The Large Rope as an "excellent thriller", adding that it has "an arresting narrative premise and an unsentimental view of the potential mean-spiritedness of village life".

References

External links

1953 films
1953 crime films
Films directed by Wolf Rilla
British crime films
British black-and-white films
Films with screenplays by Ted Willis, Baron Willis
Films about murder
1950s English-language films
1950s British films